Nogatco Rd is the seventh solo studio album by American rapper Kool Keith and his first release under his 'Mr. Nogatco' alter-ego. It was released on April 25, 2006, via Insomniac Inc. The album featured guest appearances from Sole and Sage Francis.

Track listing

Notes

Enhanced CD. Bonus material includes Nogatco Rd. film short, digital comic book panels, photos & sketches. The "Nogatco Rd." film includes videos for the following: "Bionic Fuse", "Dark Space", "Night Flyer (Force Field)".

Personnel

Aaron Gandia – engineer
Adam Beyrer – engineer
Anthony Torres – editor
Bryan Moss – artwork
C. "Carl Kavorkian" Milbourne – producer (track 8-9)
DJ SPS – scratching (tracks 1-11)
DJ Spytek – scratching (track 12)
EDK – producer (track 11)
Gabe Garton – editing assistant
Gregory Titus – cover illustration
Israel "Iz Real" Vasquetelle – arranger, concept, film director, film editor, executive producer, producer
J. "Broken Klutch" Prenelus – producer (track 4, 11)
J. "Jahson" Grimes – producer (track 6)
James Timothy Holland Jr. – guest vocals (track 12)
Jason Laughton – engineer
Keith Matthew Thornton – primary artist
Paul William Francis – guest vocals (track 12)
Paul ZSadie – authoring
Robert Koelble – guitar (track 8)
Sam Gaffin – model
T. "Mister Hill" Gumke – producer (track 3, 7)

References

2006 albums
Concept albums
Kool Keith albums